WAZS-LD, UHF digital channel 29, is a low-powered television station licensed to North Charleston, South Carolina, United States. Owned by Norsan Communications and Management, Inc., the station is a sister station to Youtoo America affiliate WJNI-LD and radio station WAZS.

External links

AZS-LD
Television channels and stations established in 2000
Low-power television stations in the United States